Sukumar Barman (1 January 1952, in Kemtali – 10 March 2012, in Agartala) was an Indian politician. He was a prominent leader of Scheduled Castes in Tripura.

Barman hailed from an impoverished fishing family in Sonamura district. His family sent him to live with an uncle in order to attend school, and he first came into contact with activist politics through the student movement. He completed his higher secondary examination in 1971. He went on to join the peasants' movement.

Barman became a member of the Communist Party of India (Marxist) in 1976. Between 1978 and 1983, he served as elected village pradhan of Kemtali. He would become a member of the Tripura State Committee of the party. He also became the general secretary of the Tripura Scheduled Caste Coordination Committee.
 
From 1988 onwards he was a member of the Tripura Legislative Assembly, representing the Nalchar constituency. During the Indian National Congress/Tripura Upajati Juba Samiti government 1988–1993, Barman was the target of several assassination attempts.

When the Left Front was elected back into office in Tripura 1993, Barman was named Minister of State. Between 1998 and 2004 he served as the Tripura state government Minister of Transport and Fisheries.  He lost his cabinet position in the downsizing of the government that came out of The Constitution (91st Amendment) Act 2003.

Barman served as the chairman of the state owned land development bank and Tripura Road Transport Corporation.  He was also a well known swimmer.

Barman died in March 2012 at G.B. Pant hospital in Agartala, where he had been admitted following a brain haemorrhage. The state government declared a two-day mourning period, during which the national flag was flown at half mast.  His body was cremated in Kemtali.

References

1952 births
2012 deaths
Communist Party of India (Marxist) politicians from Tripura
Tripura politicians
People from Sipahijala district
Tripura MLAs 1988–1993
Tripura MLAs 1993–1998
Tripura MLAs 1998–2003
Tripura MLAs 2003–2008
Tripura MLAs 2008–2013
Tripura MLAs 2013–2018